Ivy House is an historic building in Greenhalgh-with-Thistleton, Lancashire, England. It is believed to date to the early 18th century, and has been designated a Grade II listed building by Historic England. The property is located on Thistleton Road.

The building is a brick farmhouse with a slate roof in two storeys.  It originally was in two bays, with an additions bay added to the right, and an outshut and an extension at the rear.  In the original part is a central doorway and two windows in each floor divided by mullions and transoms into 30 panes.

See also
Listed buildings in Greenhalgh-with-Thistleton

Notes

References

External links
A view of the property from Thistleton Road in 2009 – Google Street View

Houses completed in the 18th century
Grade II listed buildings in Lancashire
Farmhouses in England
Buildings and structures in the Borough of Fylde